Bruce Rigsby (1937 – March 19, 2022) was an American-Australian anthropologist specializing in the languages and ethnography of native peoples on both continents. He was professor emeritus at Queensland University, and a member of both the Australian Anthropological Society and the American Anthropological Association.

Career
Bruce Rigsby was born in 1937. He obtained his bachelor's degree at the University of Louisville in international studies, specializing in the area of the Soviet bloc. He then went on to obtain a PhD in anthropology at the University of Oregon, doing fieldwork to gather materials on the Umatilla and Yakama in 1963. He absorbed the Boasian-Sapir tradition of American ethnolinguistics, combining linguistics and anthropology. His doctoral dissertation was on the southern tribes and languages of the Columbia Plateau. He developed a particular research focus on and specialization in Sahaptin ethnography, Sahaptin language and Nass-Gitksan people, their language and history.

In 1975 he became head of the new department of Anthropology at University of Queensland, and directed his interests towards the languages and tribes of the Eastern Cape York Peninsula, and Princess Charlotte Bay. Rigsby has also been active in defending indigenous claims for native title and represented the Cape York Land Council regarding the Rinyirru and Marpa National Parks land claims. Notably in his court appearance, when interviewing George Musgrave for his testimony, Rigsby adopted the elder's idiom of Australian English in deference to the Musgrave's age and status. He was adopted into the Lamalama tribe.

Generations of students have been the beneficiaries of what Alice Gaby has called Rigsby's 'phenomenal generosity'. Comments by Peter Sutton and other colleagues on his career are available at a video recording the launching of a festschrift in his honour, available on YouTube.

Publications
 1975 'Nass-Gitksan: An Analytic Ergative Syntax,' International Journal of American Linguistics vol.41 Issue 4 December 1975 pp. 344–354
 1999 with Finlayson, J. D., and Bek, H.). Introduction. In J. D. Finlayson, B. Rigsby and H. Bek (Ed.), Connections in Native Title: Genealogies, Kinship and Groups,  Australian National University, Canberra: Centre for Aboriginal Economic Policy Research pp. 1–13.
 1999 'Genealogies, kinship and local group composition: Old Yintjingga (Port Stewart) in the late 1920s,' In J. D. Finlayson, B. Rigsby and H. Bek (Ed.), Connections in Native Title: Genealogies, Kinship and Groups, Canberra: Cen. for Aboriginal Economic Policy Res., ANU pp. 107–123
 2005 'The Languages of Eastern Cape York Peninsula and Linguistic Anthropology,' In B. Rigsby and N. Peterson (eds.), Donald Thomson. The Man and Scholar, Canberra, ACT, Australia: The Academy of the Social Sciences in Australia pp. 129–142.
 2005 with and Peterson, N. 'Introduction,' in B. Rigsby and N. Peterson (eds.), Donald Thomson. The Man and Scholar,  Canberra: The Academy of the Social Sciences in Australia, pp. 1–16
 2008 'The Stevens Treaties, Indian Claims Commission docket 264, and the Ancient One known as Kennewick Man,' in Alexander Harmon (ed.), The power of promises: Rethinking Indian treaties in the Pacific Northwest,  Seattle, WA, U.S.A.: University of Washington Press pp. 244–276
 2010 'The origin and history of the name 'Sahaptin',' in Virginia Beavert and Sharon Hargus (Ed.), Ichishkíin Sínwit: Yakama/Yakima Sahaptin Dictionary, pp.xviii-xxi, Toppenish, WA, U.S.A.: Heritage University; University of Washington Press.
 2010 'The origin and history of the name Yakama/Yakima,' in Virginia Beavert and Sharon Hargus (eds.), Ichishkíin Sínwit: Yakama/Yakima Sahaptin Dictionary,  Toppenish, WA, U.S.A.: Heritage University; University of Washington Press pp.xxii-xxxiv
 (c) 'Social theory, expert evidence and the Yorta Yorta rights appeal decision,' in Louis Knafla and Haijo Westra (Eds.), Aboriginal title and indigenous peoples: Canada, Australia, and New Zealand,  Vancouver, BC, Canada: UBC Press pp. 53–84.
 2011 With Diane Hafner,'Place and property at Yintjingga/ Port Stewart under Aboriginal law and Oueensland law,' In Brett Baker, Ilana Mushin, Mark Harvey and Rod Gardner (Eds.), Indigenous language and social identity: Papers in honour of Michael Walsh,  Canberra, ACT, Australia: Pacific Linguistics pp. 33–44.
 2015 with Christophe Verstraete,A Grammar and Lexicon of Yintyingka, Walter de Gruyter

Notes and references

Notes

References

1937 births
2022 deaths
Australian anthropologists
University of Louisville alumni
University of Oregon alumni
People from Louisville, Kentucky